Viewing is the debut studio album by American post-hardcore band Stay Inside. The album was released on April 10, 2020 through No Sleep Records.

Track listing

Personnel 
 Vishnu Anantha — Drums, Artwork
 Chris Johns — Guitar + Vocals
 Chris Lawless — Guitar + Screams
 Bryn Nieboer — Bass + Vocals
 Jon Markson — Producer
 Alan Douches — Mastering

References 

2020 debut albums
No Sleep Records albums